Kallarati  is a newspaper published in Albania.

Newspapers published in Albania